This is a list of defunct airlines of Morocco.

See also

 List of airlines of Morocco
 List of airports in Morocco

References

Morocco
Airlines
Airlines, defunct